Pamela Manzi, Ph.D., is an Italian chemist, who is active in the fields of analytical chemistry and food science; she is a researcher of the "Istituto nazionale di ricerca per gli alimenti e la nutrizione" (INRAN) since 1996.

Works 
 Panfili G, Manzi P, Pizzoferrato L, (1994) HPLC simultaneous determination of tocopherol, carotenes, retinol and its geometric isomers in Italian cheeses. Analyst 119, 1161-1165.
 Manzi P, Panfili G, Pizzoferrato L, (1996) Normal and reversed phase HPLC for more complete evaluation of tocopherols, retinols, carotenes and sterols in dairy products. Chromatographia 43, 89-93.
 Panfili G, Manzi P, Pizzoferrato L, (1998) Influence of thermal and other manufacturing stresses on retinol isomerization in milk and dairy products. J Dairy Res 65, 253-260.
 Manzi P, Pizzoferrato L, (2000) Beta glucans in edible mushrooms. Food Chem 68, 315-318.
 Manzi P, Aguzzi A, Pizzoferrato L, (2001) Nutritional value of mushrooms widely consumed in Italy. Food Chem 73(3), 321-325.

References

Literature 
 Milch als treibender Motor in der Wirtschaft // Südtirol News, 4 April 2018.
 James MacDonald: Got (Cockroach) Milk? Is cockroach milk the next hot super food? // JSTOR Daily, 4 September 2016.

Web-sources 
 

Living people
Year of birth missing (living people)
Italian chemists
Italian women chemists